A Lesson in Crime is an EP by Tokyo Police Club released April 27, 2006. It reached #194 on the Canadian album charts. The single "Nature of the Experiment" is featured as the opening to the Comedy Central sketch comedy show Nick Swardson's Pretend Time.

Track listing
All songs written by Alsop, Hooks, Monks, and Wright.

Personnel 

 Greg Alsop – drums
 Joshua Hook – guitar
 Graham Wright – keyboards, vocals
 David Monks – vocals, bass guitar
 Jon Drew – producer, engineering, tambourine
 Rich Cohen – management
 Geoff Wilson – artwork

Charts

References

2006 debut EPs
Tokyo Police Club albums
Paper Bag Records EPs